Pero radiosaria is a species of moth in the family Geometridae (geometrid moths). It was described by George Duryea Hulst in 1886 and is found in North America, where it has been recorded from southern California to Texas.

The wingspan is 28–36 mm. Adults are variable, with several colour forms ranging from light yellow brown, to brown, grey-brown and orange-brown. Adults have been recorded on wing year round.

The larvae feed on Clematis drummondii.

The MONA or Hodges number for Pero radiosaria is 6749.

References

Further reading
 Arnett, Ross H. (2000). American Insects: A Handbook of the Insects of America North of Mexico. CRC Press.
 Scoble, Malcolm J., ed. (1999). Geometrid Moths of the World: A Catalogue (Lepidoptera, Geometridae). 1016.

External links
Butterflies and Moths of North America
NCBI Taxonomy Browser, Pero radiosaria

Geometridae
Moths described in 1886